Elmeri Eronen (born 27 January 1995) is a Finnish professional ice hockey defenceman. He is currently playing with Timrå IK in the Swedish Hockey League (SHL).

Eronen made his Liiga debut playing with HC TPS during the 2013–14 Liiga season.

References

External links

1995 births
Living people
Finnish ice hockey defencemen
HPK players
Timrå IK players
HC TPS players
Sportspeople from Turku
21st-century Finnish people